Endotricha plinthopa is a species of snout moth in the genus Endotricha. It was described by Edward Meyrick in 1886, and is known from Samoa.

References

Moths described in 1886
Endotrichini